Dianella brevicaulis, commonly known as the coast flax-lily, is a tufted, rhizomatous, perennial herb with fibrous roots and blue-purple flowers.  Its long leaves form a soft, green tussock which conceal the flowering stems.  It grows to 0.5 m in height and prefers sandy soils to quite far inland.  It is native to southern Australia where it is usually found in coastal and subcoastal habitats and sandy inland ranges.

References

brevicaulis
Flora of Victoria (Australia)
Flora of Western Australia
Flora of New South Wales
Flora of Tasmania